The Ministry of Education and National Reconciliation is the education ministry of Saint Vincent and the Grenadines. The head office of the ministry is in the government ministerial complex in Kingstown.

 Curtis King is the minister of education. The title had also been "Minister of Education, National Reconciliation, Ecclesiastical Affairs, and Information".

Vincentian Schools give Christian religious education which does not follow a particular denomination.

See also
 Education in Saint Vincent and the Grenadines

References

External links
 Ministry of Education and National Reconciliation

Education ministries
Education in Saint Vincent and the Grenadines
Government of Saint Vincent and the Grenadines